The University Ground was a cricket ground in Barnwell, a suburb in northeast Cambridge, England.  The ground was located off Mill Road and served as the University of Cambridge's main ground from 1821 to 1830.  It was surrounded on three sides by open countryside and on one side by the New Barnwell Church.  Today the ground no longer exists, with the vast majority of it becoming the Mill Road Cemetery in 1847.

History
Cambridge University Cricket Club moved from Parker's Piece to the University Ground by 1821. The University played its first match at the ground in that year, in a first-class fixture against the Cambridge Town Club. Further first-class matches against the same opposition were held there in 1822, 1825, and 1826. Three first-class matches played in 1827, 1828, and 1829 featured the Cambridge Union Club as the opposition. The final first-class match played there came in 1830, with the Cambridge Town Club returning as the opposition. Cricket ceased to be played at the ground following 1831, with the ground at Parker's Piece improved by levelling, the cricket club returned to playing there. Following abandonment, the location later became the Mill Road Cemetery.

Records

First-class
 Highest team total: 252 by Cambridge University v Cambridge Union Club, 1829
 Lowest team total: 47 by Cambridge Union Club v Cambridge University, 1827
 Highest individual innings: 97* by George Hume for Cambridge University v Cambridge Town Club, 1821
 Best bowling in an innings: 6-? by Smith for Cambridge University v Cambridge Town Club, 1825

See also
Parker's Piece 
Fenner's
List of cricket grounds in England and Wales

References

External links
University Ground at CricketArchive
University Ground as ESPNcricinfo

Cambridge University Cricket Club
1821 establishments in England
1830 disestablishments
Cricket grounds in Cambridgeshire
Defunct cricket grounds in England
Student cricket in the United Kingdom
Sports venues in Cambridge
Sport at the University of Cambridge
University of Cambridge sites
History of Cambridge
Defunct sports venues in Cambridgeshire
Sports venues completed in 1821